Chour Harpal is an old village in Rawalpindi District.

Rawalpindi District